Events in the year 1989 in Belgium.

Incumbents
 Monarch: Baudouin
 Prime Minister: Wilfried Martens

Events
 18 June – Brussels-Capital Region comes into being
 15 December – Paul Schruers becomes Bishop of Hasselt

Publications

Births

Deaths
 24/25 December – Danny Huwé (born 1943), journalist

References

 
1980s in Belgium
20th century in Belgium
Events in Belgium
Deaths in Belgium